, founded in 1884, is a French-language digital newspaper published daily in Montreal, Quebec, Canada. It is owned by an independent nonprofit trust.

 was formerly a broadsheet daily, considered a newspaper of record in Canada. Its Sunday edition was discontinued in 2009, and the weekday edition in 2016. The weekend Saturday printed edition was discontinued on 31 December 2017, turning  into an entirely digital newspaper.

Audience and sections
 is published on its website, .ca, and its mobile app, . The newspaper targets an educated, middle-class readership. Its main competitors are two Montreal print dailies, the tabloid-format , which aims at a more populist audience, and the more left-leaning broadsheet .

 comprises several sections, dealing individually with arts, sports, business and economy and other themes. Its Saturday print edition (now discontinued) contained over 10 sections.

The newspaper's archives from 2000 to 2019 are available on its website.

History

The paper was founded on October 20, 1884 by William-Edmond Blumhart. Trefflé Berthiaume took over in 1889. The fledgling newspaper's circulation would soon pass that of its main competitor of the time, .

In April 1901, the paper organized a cruise to Quebec City. It also organized a charity to give Christmas gifts to poor children.

A front-page illustration on December 3, 1904, issue celebrated the 50th anniversary of the proclamation of the Roman Catholic dogma of the Immaculate Conception. The practice of the time was to have an illustration on the front page, rather than a photograph.

Between July 1971 and February 1972,  endured a seven-month labour dispute between its then-owner Power Corporation of Canada and 11 trade unions, prompted by the introduction of new printing technology that could have jeopardized the jobs of newspaper typographers. This resulted in  not being printed between October 28, 1971, and February 9, 1972.

The style and presentation of the print newspaper changed immensely during the course of the 20th century. It underwent complete graphic redesigns in 1986 and 2003.

From 1984 to 2014,  every year honoured a "Person of the Year", for example, Julie Payette, Daniel Langlois and Gaétan Boucher. In 1984, it also published a commemorative book in order to celebrate its 100th anniversary.

In 2001, with the arrival of news editor Guy Crevier, the newspaper began a radical remodelling. The graphic design was modernized, new sections were created, international coverage was greatly increased, and many new young, up-and-coming journalists were hired.

In 2011,  rebranded its new-media operations from .ca to .ca. In 2013, the newspaper launched , a free digital edition for iPad.

The newspaper announced in September 2015 that it would end its weekday print edition in 2016 and that thereafter the weekday paper would be available only in digital form. The Saturday edition continued in print until December 30, 2017.

On May 8, 2018, it was announced that  would become a non-profit organization and sever ties with its owner, Power Corporation. This move allowed the newspaper to accept private donations and governmental support.

Editorial line

The editorial board of  has been consistently supportive of Canadian federalism over the past 25 years, though individual columnists may freely express less sympathy. The newspaper's editorials endorsed the federalist option in both the 1980 Quebec referendum and the 1995 Quebec referendum which were held on the issue of Quebec's national sovereignism.

The editorial board leaves room for the whole spectrum of opinions.  It supported same-sex marriage legislation in Canada, the protests against the War in Iraq, and criticized both sides in the 2012 Quebec student protests. The paper endorsed the Conservative Party in the 2006 election. This was primarily out of a reasoning that the Canadian government was in need of a necessary change after more than 12 years of Liberal rule. Similarly, with Stephen Harper's Conservatives having been in power for nine years at the time,  endorsed Justin Trudeau's Liberal Party in the 2015 election.

Guy Crevier is currently the editor, and François Cardinal is the assistant editor. Noted journalists associated with the paper include Patrick Lagacé, Yves Boisvert, Agnès Gruda and Lysiane Gagnon.

Television
The newspaper's television production arm, has produced the series , hosted by former politician Mario Dumont, for the Quebec television network V (formerly TQS).

Notable staff
 Marcel Desjardins — vice-president, assistant editor and news director

See also
List of Quebec media
List of newspapers in Canada
Montreal newspapers: 
 The Gazette
 
 
 
 Montreal Daily News (defunct)
 Montreal Star (defunct)

References

External links
 Official website
Twitter
Facebook
LinkedIn

Publications established in 1884
French-language newspapers published in Quebec
Gesca Limitée publications
Newspapers published in Montreal
Daily newspapers published in Quebec
1884 establishments in Quebec
Online newspapers with defunct print editions